The Esk Highway (route number A4) is a highway in Tasmania, Australia.  It connects the Midland Highway, located down the centre of the state, with the Tasman Highway, which is located on the east coast of the state.

Its western end joins the Midland Highway at Conara Junction, just north of Campbell Town.  Its eastern end passes through St Marys and then deviates to a north-east direction, where it connections to the Tasman Highway.  Another road, which follows a path south-east of St Marys, joins another part of the Tasman Highway at Chain of Lagoons - although this is also marked as route A4, it is named Elephant Pass Road and is not part of the Esk Highway.

Major intersections

See also

 Highways in Australia
 List of highways in Tasmania

References

Highways in Tasmania
North East Tasmania